The 1996 Pacific typhoon season has no official bounds; it ran year-round in 1996, but most tropical cyclones tend to form in the northwestern Pacific Ocean between May and November. These dates conventionally delimit the period of each year when most tropical cyclones form in the northwestern Pacific Ocean.

The scope of this article is limited to the Pacific Ocean, north of the equator and west of the international date line. Storms that form east of the date line and north of the equator are called hurricanes; see 1996 Pacific hurricane season. Tropical Storms formed in the entire west pacific basin were assigned a name by the Joint Typhoon Warning Center. Tropical depressions in this basin have the "W" suffix added to their number. Tropical depressions that enter or form in the Philippine area of responsibility are assigned a name by the Philippine Atmospheric, Geophysical and Astronomical Services Administration or PAGASA. This can often result in the same storm having two names, like Herb or Sally.

Season summary

Systems

Tropical Storm 01W (Asiang) 

On February 23, a large area of convection developed south of the Philippines Sea. The convection developed into a low pressure area and was at first bombarded by wind shear, but conditions soon turned favorable which allowed it to strengthen rapidly on February 27 before becoming a Tropical depression later that day. The JMA upgraded 01W into a Tropical Storm before it drifted over the Philippines on February 29, and weakened slightly due to land interaction.

Tropical Storm Ann (Biring) 

Ann (Biring) developed on March 30. The storm struck the Philippines on April 7 and dissipated three days later.

Tropical Depression 03W 

Tropical Depression 03W existed over the South China Sea from April 25 to April 26.

Typhoon Bart (Konsing) 

Bart existed from May 8 to May 18.

Tropical Storm Cam (Ditang) 

Cam developed over the South China Sea on May 18. The cyclone headed northeastward to east-northeastward and dissipated over the Pacific Ocean on May 23.

Typhoon Dan 

Dan existed from July 5 to July 11.

Typhoon Eve 

A Tropical Upper Tropospheric Trough spawned Tropical Depression 7W on July 10 over the open Western Pacific. It tracked generally west-northwestward, strengthening to a tropical storm on the 14th. On the 15th Eve became a typhoon, which was followed by a period of explosive deepening to a 100 mph Typhoon, with a pressure drop of 40 mb from early on the 15th to early on the 16th. An eyewall replacement cycle weakened Eve to a 95 mph typhoon, but as the outer eyewall contracted, the storm again reached wind speeds of 97 mph before hitting southern Japan on the 18th. Rapidly weakening over the mountains, Eve turned eastward over the islands and the last warning was issued on the 20th. It restrengthened to a tropical storm east of Japan, and continued northeastward until dissipation on the 27th. Eve, despite being a Category 4 at landfall, caused no reported deaths and only 9 injuries.

Severe Tropical Storm Frankie (Edeng) 

An active monsoon trough over the Western Pacific Ocean developed 3 typhoons; Frankie, Gloria, and Herb. The first, Frankie, developed in the South China Sea on July 19. It tracked west-northwestward and became a tropical storm on the 21st. After crossing the island of Hainan Frankie rapidly intensified to a 100 mph typhoon, 945 millibar over the Gulf of Tonkin. It northern Vietnam on the 23rd, and dissipated 2 days later over China. 104 people were reported killed or missing in association with Frankie, and damage figures in Vietnam are estimated at over 16.65 trillion (US$1.4 billion) (1996 US Dollars).

Typhoon Gloria (Gloring) 

The same monsoon trough that spawned Frankie also spawned a tropical depression on July 19 east of the Philippines. It headed northwestward, slowly organizing into a tropical storm on the 22nd. The next day Gloria reached typhoon strength, and a day later it reached its peak of 100 mph winds. Gloria brushed the northern coast of the Philippines and turned northward to hit Taiwan on the 26th. After crossing the island and the Taiwan Strait, Gloria hit China where she dissipated on the 27th. Gloria caused 23 casualties, 20 of which were in the northern Philippines. In addition, damage was estimated at $20 million (1996 USD).

Typhoon Herb (Huaning) 

Super Typhoon Herb was the strongest and the largest storm of 1996. Herb struck Ryūkyū Islands, Taiwan and China. Maximum sustained winds of the cyclone reached  over the open ocean. The system led to 590 casualties and US$5 billion in damage (1996 dollars).

Tropical Depression Ian 

Ian existed from July 27 to July 31.

Severe Tropical Storm Joy 

Joy existed from July 29 to August 6.

Typhoon Kirk (Isang) 

A monsoon depression developed on July 28 over the open Pacific Ocean. It headed northwestward, slowly consolidating to become a tropical storm on the 5th. While south of Japan, Kirk drifted to the southeast and looped back to the west, strengthening to a typhoon on the 8th while looping. It continued slowly northwestward, and while curving to the northeast Kirk reached a peak of 110 mph winds. The typhoon struck southwestern Japan at that intensity on the 14th. It weakened over the country, and dissipated on the 16th over the northern Pacific. Kirk caused heavy flooding, resulting in at least 2 deaths and moderate damage.

Tropical Storm Lisa 

Lisa developed over the South China Sea on August 4. The storm headed northeastward and struck China on August 6, then dissipated two days later.

Tropical Depression 15W 

Tropical Depression 15W existed from August 11 to August 17.

Tropical Depression Marty 

The monsoon trough spawned a tropical depression over southern China on August 11. It drifted southwestward, entering the Gulf of Tonkin on the 12th. An extremely small cyclone, it reached tropical storm strength on the 13th and a peak of 60 mph on the 14th. Marty made landfall on the 14th on northern Vietnam, where it dissipated 3 days later. Though small and somewhat weak, Marty managed to cause moderate damage and flooding, amounting to the deaths of 125 with 107 people missing.

Tropical Depression 17W 

Tropical Depression 17W existed from August 13 to August 16.

Typhoon Niki (Lusing) 

Niki developed on August 16. It struck Luzon on August 19 and then crossed the South China Sea. The typhoon later made landfall in Hainan on August 20 and northern Vietnam on August 21. Niki dissipated by August 23.

Typhoon Orson 

Orson existed from August 20 to September 3.

Tropical Storm Piper 

Piper existed from August 22 to August 26.

Tropical Depression 21W 

Tropical Depression 21W existed from August 25 to August 29.

Tropical Storm Rick 

Rick existed from August 27 to September 3.

Typhoon Sally (Maring) 

On September 2, a tropical depression developed well east of the Philippines. It headed west-northwestward, reaching tropical storm strength on the 5th and typhoon strength on the 6th. On the 7th Sally rapidly intensified to a 160 mph Super Typhoon while passing just north of the Philippines. It weakened slightly yet steadily to a 115 mph typhoon over the South China Sea, hitting the Luichow Peninsula of China on the 9th, and dissipated the next day over the country. Sally brought heavy rain and damage to China, causing 114 casualties, 110 people missing, and economic losses estimated at $1.5 billion (1996 USD).

Tropical Depression 24W (Ningning) 

Ningning developed on September 6. It struck Luzon on September 9 and then entered the South China Sea. Ningning dissipated offshore Vietnam on September 14.

Typhoon Violet (Osang) 

Violet existed from September 11 to September 23.

Typhoon Tom 

Tom existed from September 11 to September 21.

Severe Tropical Storm Willie 

An active monsoon trough that also developed Typhoons Tom (25W) and Violet (26W) spawned a tropical depression in the Gulf of Tonkin on September 16. It moved counter-clockwise around Hainan Island, becoming a tropical storm on the 17th and a typhoon on the 19th. It crossed the narrow Hainan Strait between Hainan and China, and continued west-southwestward across the Gulf of Tonkin. Willie made landfall on Vietnam on the 22nd, and dissipated the next day. The typhoon resulted in 38 fatalities from flooding. Damage in Vietnam reached over 500 billion dong (US$40 million, 1996 dollars).

Typhoon Yates 

Yates lasted from September 19 to October 1.

Typhoon Zane (Paring) 

Zane existed from September 23 to October 3.

Tropical Depression Abel (Reming) 

In the Philippines, Abel killed eight people, left seven others missing and caused $4.3 million (1996 USD, $6.4 million 2013 USD) in damages.

Tropical Depression 31W 

Tropical Depression 31W existed from October 13 to October 17.

Severe Tropical Storm Beth (Seniang) 

Beth developed on October 13. It struck Luzon on October 17 and then reached the South China Sea. On October 21, Beth moved ashore in Vietnam and dissipated the next day. One person had drowned in northern Philippines, in the province of Ifugao, while another four remained missing in another province. The PAGASA recorded sustained winds of 120 km/h (75 mph) as the storm impacted the northeastern portion of Cagayan.

Typhoon Carlo 

Carlo existed from October 20 to October 26.

Tropical Depression 34W 

Tropical Depression 34W formed over the Sulu Sea on October 24. It struck Palawan on the next day. After tracking across the South China Sea, 34W made landfall in Thailand on October 30. It crossed the Malay Peninsula and entered the North Indian Ocean basin later that day. The storm dissipated shortly thereafter, but later re-developing into the Andhra Pradesh cyclone.

Tropical Depression 35W 

35W killed 60 people and caused $138 million in damages.

Typhoon Dale (Ulpiang) 

A cluster of thunderstorm activity formed southeast of Guam on November 2. The system slowly organized, becoming a tropical depression on November 4. Remaining nearly stationary, the depression intensified into a tropical storm late in the day. The cyclone then turned westward, becoming a typhoon by November 7. Damage on the island totaled US$3.5 million (1996 dollars.) Continuing to intensify, Dale became a supertyphoon in the Philippine Sea on November 9. On November 10, Dale turned north, recurving east of the Philippines.

Tropical Storm Ernie (Toyang) 

In the Philippines, Ernie killed 24 people, left 12 others missing and caused $5.1 million in damages.

Tropical Depression 38W 

Tropical Storm 38W existed from November 4 to November 12.

Tropical Depression 39W 

Tropical Depression 39W developed on November 6. It struck Luzon on November 8 and then dissipated two days later.

Tropical Depression 40W 

Tropical Depression 40W developed on November 25. It struck Mindanao several hours before dissipating on November 30.

Tropical Depression 41W 

Tropical Depression 41W existed over the South China Sea from December 14 to December 20.

Severe Tropical Storm Fern 

A tropical depression formed on December 21, when a low-level circulation center began to produce deep convection. The depression strengthened into a tropical storm the next day, and was given the name Fern by the Joint Typhoon Warning Center (JTWC). The storm slowly intensified into a Category 1 typhoon on the Saffir–Simpson hurricane wind scale, according to JTWC. Fern peaked north of Yap on December 26, with JTWC assessing winds of 150 km/h (90 mph), while the Regional Specialized Meteorological Center, Japan Meteorological Agency (JMA) assessed peak winds of 110 km/h (70 mph), just below typhoon strength. The storm soon became sheared and weakened slowly. Fern continued to weaken to a tropical depression on December 30. Both agencies stopped advisories later on the same day.

Tropical Depression Greg 

Two active monsoon troughs that also developed Typhoon Fern and Southern Hemisphere Cyclones Ophelia, Phil, and Fergus spawned Tropical Depression 43W in the South China Sea on December 21. Due to the troughs' nature, the depression headed east-southeastward, where it strengthened into the final tropical storm of the year on the 24th; Greg. After reaching a peak of  winds it crossed the northern part of Borneo on the 25th. It continued east-southeastward until dissipation on the 27th, south of the Philippines. Greg caused extensive property damage on Borneo from torrential flooding, resulting in 127 deaths and 100 people missing.

Storm names 

During the season 30 named tropical cyclones developed in the Western Pacific and were named by the Joint Typhoon Warning Center, when it was determined that they had become tropical storms. These names were contributed to a revised list which started in 1996.

Philippines 

The Philippine Atmospheric, Geophysical and Astronomical Services Administration uses its own naming scheme for tropical cyclones in their area of responsibility. PAGASA assigns names to tropical depressions that form within their area of responsibility and any tropical cyclone that might move into their area of responsibility. Should the list of names for a given year prove to be insufficient, names are taken from an auxiliary list, the first 10 of which are published each year before the season starts. Names not retired from this list will be used again in the 2000 season. This is the same list used for the 1992 season. PAGASA uses its own naming scheme that starts in the Filipino alphabet, with names of Filipino female names ending with "ng" (A, B, K, D, etc.).

Season effects 
This table summarizes all the systems that developed within or moved into the North Pacific Ocean, to the west of the International Date Line during 1997. The tables also provide an overview of a systems intensity, duration, land areas affected and any deaths or damages associated with the system.

|-
| TD ||  || bgcolor=#| || bgcolor=#| || bgcolor=#| || Philippines || None || None ||
|-
| 01W (Asiang) ||  || bgcolor=#| || bgcolor=#| || bgcolor=#| || Philippines ||  None || None ||
|-
| Ann (Biring) ||  || bgcolor=#| || bgcolor=#| || bgcolor=#| || Caroline Islands, Philippines ||  None || None ||
|-
| 03W ||  || bgcolor=#| || bgcolor=#| || bgcolor=#| || None || None || None ||
|-
| Bart (Konsing) ||  || bgcolor=#| || bgcolor=#| || bgcolor=#| || Philippines || None || None ||
|-
| Cam (Ditang) ||  || bgcolor=#| || bgcolor=#| || bgcolor=#| || Philippines, Taiwan ||  None || None ||
|-
| TD ||  || bgcolor=#| || bgcolor=#| || bgcolor=#| || South China || None || None ||
|-
| Dan ||  || bgcolor=#| || bgcolor=#| || bgcolor=#| || Japan || None || None ||
|-
|| Eve ||  || bgcolor=#| || bgcolor=#| || bgcolor=#| || Japan || None || None ||
|-
| Frankie (Edeng) ||  || bgcolor=#| || bgcolor=#| || bgcolor=#| || South China, Vietnam ||  ||  || 
|-
|| Gloria (Gloring) ||  || bgcolor=#| || bgcolor=#| || bgcolor=#| || Philippines, Taiwan, China ||  ||  ||
|-
|| Herb (Huaning) ||  || bgcolor=#| || bgcolor=#| || bgcolor=#| || Mariana Islands, Taiwan, Ryukyu Islands, China ||  ||  ||
|-
| Ian ||  || bgcolor=#| || bgcolor=#| || bgcolor=#| || Mariana Islands || None || None ||
|-
| Joy ||  || bgcolor=#| || bgcolor=#| || bgcolor=#| || None || None || None ||
|-
| TD ||  || bgcolor=#| || bgcolor=#| || bgcolor=#| || Caroline Islands || None || None ||
|-
| TD ||  || bgcolor=#| || bgcolor=#| || bgcolor=#| || South China || None || None ||
|-
| Kirk (Isang) ||  || bgcolor=#| || bgcolor=#| || bgcolor=#| || Japan || None ||  ||
|-
| Lisa ||  || bgcolor=#| || bgcolor=#| || bgcolor=#| || South China ||  None || None ||
|-
| TD ||  || bgcolor=#| || bgcolor=#| || bgcolor=#| || None || None || None ||
|-
| 15W ||  || bgcolor=#| || bgcolor=#| || bgcolor=#| || None || None || None ||
|-
| TD ||  || bgcolor=#| || bgcolor=#| || bgcolor=#| || South China || None || None ||
|-
| Marty ||  || bgcolor=#| || bgcolor=#| || bgcolor=#| || South China, Vietnam ||  ||  ||
|-
| 17W ||  || bgcolor=#| || bgcolor=#| || bgcolor=#| || None || None || None ||
|-
| Niki (Lusing) ||  || bgcolor=#| || bgcolor=#| || bgcolor=#| || Philippines, Vietnam, South China ||  || Unknown ||
|-
| TD ||  || bgcolor=#| || bgcolor=#| || bgcolor=#| || None || None || None ||
|-
| Orson ||  || bgcolor=#| || bgcolor=#| || bgcolor=#| || Mariana Islands || None || None ||
|-
| TD ||  || bgcolor=#| || bgcolor=#| || bgcolor=#| || None || None || None ||
|-
| Piper ||  || bgcolor=#| || bgcolor=#| || bgcolor=#| || None ||  None || None ||
|-
| TD ||  || bgcolor=#| || bgcolor=#| || bgcolor=#| || None || None || None ||
|-
| 21W ||  || bgcolor=#| || bgcolor=#| || bgcolor=#| || None || None || None ||
|-
| Rick ||  || bgcolor=#| || bgcolor=#| || bgcolor=#| || None || None || None ||
|-
| Sally (Maring) ||  || bgcolor=#| || bgcolor=#| || bgcolor=#| || Philippines, South China ||  ||  ||
|-
| 24W (Ningning) ||  || bgcolor=#| || bgcolor=#| || bgcolor=#| || Philippines, Vietnam || None || None ||
|-
| Violet (Osang) ||  || bgcolor=#| || bgcolor=#| || bgcolor=#| || Japan || None || None ||
|-
| Tom ||  || bgcolor=#| || bgcolor=#| || bgcolor=#| || Mariana Islands || None || None ||
|-
| Willie ||  || bgcolor=#| || bgcolor=#| || bgcolor=#| || South China, Vietnam, Cambodia, Laos ||  ||  || 
|-
| Yates ||  || bgcolor=#| || bgcolor=#| || bgcolor=#| || Mariana Islands || None || None ||
|-
| Zane (Paring) ||  || bgcolor=#| || bgcolor=#| || bgcolor=#| || Marshall Islands, Mariana Islands || None || None ||
|-
| Abel (Reming) ||  || bgcolor=#| || bgcolor=#| || bgcolor=#| || Philippines, Vietnam ||  ||  ||
|-
| Beth (Seniang) ||  || bgcolor=#| || bgcolor=#| || bgcolor=#| || Philippines, Vietnam|| Unknown ||  || 
|-
| 31W ||  || bgcolor=#| || bgcolor=#| || bgcolor=#| || Mariana Islands || None || None ||
|-
| Carlo ||  || bgcolor=#| || bgcolor=#| || bgcolor=#| || Mariana Islands || None || None ||
|-
| 34W ||  || bgcolor=#| || bgcolor=#| || bgcolor=#| || Mariana Islands || None || None ||
|-
| 35W ||  || bgcolor=#| || bgcolor=#| || bgcolor=#| || Vietnam ||  ||  ||
|-
| Dale (Ulpiang) ||  || bgcolor=#| || bgcolor=#| || bgcolor=#| || Caroline Islands, Mariana Islands || None || None ||
|-
| Ernie (Toyang) ||  || bgcolor=#| || bgcolor=#| || bgcolor=#| || Philippines ||  ||  ||
|-
| 38W ||  || bgcolor=#| || bgcolor=#| || bgcolor=#| || Wake Island || None || None ||
|-
| 39W ||  || bgcolor=#| || bgcolor=#| || bgcolor=#| || Mariana Islands || None || None ||
|-
| 40W ||  || bgcolor=#| || bgcolor=#| || bgcolor=#| || Mariana Islands || None || None ||
|-
| 41W ||  || bgcolor=#| || bgcolor=#| || bgcolor=#| || None || None || None ||
|-
| Fern ||  || bgcolor=#| || bgcolor=#| || bgcolor=#| || Caroline Islands, Mariana Islands || || None ||
|-
| Greg ||  || bgcolor=#| || bgcolor=#| || bgcolor=#| || Malaysia, Philippines, Borneo || None ||  ||
|-

See also 

 1996 Pacific hurricane season
 1996 Atlantic hurricane season
 1996 North Indian Ocean cyclone season
 South-West Indian Ocean cyclone seasons: 1995–96, 1996–97
 Australian region cyclone seasons: 1995–96, 1996–97
 South Pacific cyclone seasons: 1995–96, 1996–97

References

External links 
 Japan Meteorological Agency
 Joint Typhoon Warning Center .
 China Meteorological Agency
 National Weather Service Guam
 Hong Kong Observatory
 Macau Meteorological Geophysical Services
 Korea Meteorological Agency
 Philippine Atmospheric, Geophysical and Astronomical Services Administration
 Taiwan Central Weather Bureau
 Satellite movie of 1996 Pacific typhoon season